Chanty Marostica, formerly known as Chantel Marostica, is a Canadian stand-up comedian who won SiriusXM Canada's Top Comic competition in 2018 and received a Juno Award nomination for Comedy Album of the Year at the Juno Awards of 2019 for The Chanty Show.

Marostica came out as non-binary in 2016, and uses gender-neutral pronouns.

Originally from Winnipeg, Manitoba, they are currently based in Toronto, Ontario. They organize a number of events for LGBTQ comedians, including Church Street Comedy nights at Pegasus, and the touring comedy show Queer and Present Danger.

Marostica won Best Breakout Artist at the 2018 Canadian Comedy Awards. In 2019, they won Best Standup and Best Comedy Album (The Chanty Show).

References

Canadian stand-up comedians
Transgender comedians
Transgender non-binary people
People from Winnipeg
Living people
Comedians from Toronto
21st-century Canadian comedians
Year of birth missing (living people)
Comedians from Manitoba
Canadian Comedy Award winners
Non-binary comedians
21st-century Canadian LGBT people
Canadian LGBT comedians